The 1975–76 Stanford Cardinal men's basketball team represented Stanford University as a member of the Pacific-8 Conference during the 1975–76 NCAA Division I men's basketball season.

Roster

Schedule

References 

Stanford Cardinal
Stanford Cardinal men's basketball seasons
Stanford Cardinal men's basketball
Stanford Cardinal men's basketball